Chron may refer to:

Science 

 Chronozone or chron, a term used for a time interval in chronostratigraphy
 Polarity chron or chron, in magnetostratigraphy, the time interval between polarity reversals of the Earth's magnetic field

Other 

 Chron (album), a 2014 album by Arve Henriksen
 Houston Chronicle, a newspaper whose website is Chron.com

See also 

 Chrono (disambiguation)